Horace Augustus Hildreth (December 2, 1902 – June 2, 1988) was born in Gardiner, Maine, the son of an attorney. Hildreth attended local schools before graduating from Bowdoin College in the class of 1925 and receiving his LL.B. from Harvard University in 1928.

In Boston he joined the prestigious law firm of Ropes, Gray, Best, Coolidge and Rugg before returning to Maine with the desire for a political career. Elected to the Maine House of Representatives in 1940 and the Maine Senate in 1942, he served as 109th President of the Maine Senate for the 1943–1944 term.

He won the Republican gubernatorial primary in 1944 and was elected the 59th Governor of Maine by a landslide margin. Reelected in 1946 by another large margin he was a supporter of the University of Maine and education for veterans.

From 1947 to 1948 he chaired the National Governors Conference and proposed that the retail sales tax be the exclusive province of the federal government as a trade-off for the elimination of federal gas, inheritance and alcohol taxes.

In 1948 he lost the Republican nomination for U.S. Senator to Margaret Chase Smith thus ending his political career. In 1949 he founded Community Broadcasting Service, a company which in 1953 would establish Maine's first television station, WABI-TV.  Community Broadcasting Service later became known as Diversified Communications, a company which is still in existence today and still controlled by the Hildreth family.

From the time of his loss of the senatorial nomination until his appointment as Ambassador to Pakistan, Hildreth served as President of Bucknell University in Lewisburg, Pennsylvania.

From 1953 to 1957, Hildreth served the Dwight D. Eisenhower administration as United States Ambassador to Pakistan. His daughter Josephine Hildreth married the son of the President of Pakistan, Iskandar Mirza. In 1958, he was the Republican candidate for Governor, but was defeated by Democrat Clinton Clausen. In 1967, he bought a controlling share of a Portland radio station, but withdrew from active participation in its operation in 1974.

Hildreth died on June 2, 1988, of a heart attack.

Hildreth's son, Hoddy Hildreth, later became a member of the Maine House of Representatives and a leading conservationist.

References

|-

|-

|-

|-

|-

1902 births
1988 deaths
20th-century American lawyers
20th-century American politicians
Ambassadors of the United States to Pakistan
Presidents of Bucknell University
Bowdoin College alumni
People from Gardiner, Maine
Republican Party governors of Maine
Harvard Law School alumni
Maine lawyers
Republican Party members of the Maine House of Representatives
Presidents of the Maine Senate
Republican Party Maine state senators
People associated with Ropes & Gray
20th-century American academics